Epanor Vítor da Costa Filho (born 1 September 1949 in Brazil), better known as just Víctor Ephanor, is a Brazilian retired footballer.

References

Brazilian footballers
Association football forwards
Living people
1949 births
Atlético Junior footballers